Elizabeth Jelaine Van Welie (born 17 November 1979 in Dunedin, New Zealand) is a former swimmer from New Zealand. She competed at the 2000 Summer Olympics and at the 2002 Commonwealth Games where she won a silver medal in the women's 400m individual medley.

References

1979 births
Living people
Olympic swimmers of New Zealand
Swimmers at the 2000 Summer Olympics
New Zealand female swimmers
Commonwealth Games silver medallists for New Zealand
Swimmers at the 2002 Commonwealth Games
New Zealand people of Dutch descent
Commonwealth Games medallists in swimming
Swimmers from Dunedin
Medallists at the 2002 Commonwealth Games